A Hazard of Hearts is a 1987 made-for-television romantic drama film starring Helena Bonham Carter in one of her first major roles. It is based on a 1949 novel by Barbara Cartland.

Plot
Sir Giles Staverley, a compulsive gambler, is tricked into gambling away his home by his old adversary Lord Harry Wrotham. As Staverley is distraught and desperate, Wrotham gives him one last chance - he will gamble everything Staverley has lost against Staverley's daughter's hand in marriage and her trust fund of 80,000 guineas. Staverley agrees and loses once again.

Unable to face his daughter, Serena, Staverley kills himself. Lord Justin Vulcan, a notoriously cool, clear-headed gambler, challenges Wrotham for the house and the girl. Much to Wrotham's disgust, Vulcan wins. Justin now finds himself in possession of the house and Serena, but has no idea of what to do with them. After meeting Serena and realising that she is much younger and more attractive than he had imagined, he installs her as a guest at Mandrake, his family home. This decision is made despite the opposition of Justin's mother, Lady Harriet Vulcan.

As Lady Vulcan attempts to marry Serena off to anyone except her son, Serena and Justin become friends and he teaches her about Mandrake, the home he loves. A crisis forces Serena and Justin to confront their feelings for each other. Can the course of true love run smoothly for them?

Cast
 Helena Bonham Carter - Serena Staverley
 Marcus Gilbert - Lord Justin Vulcan
 Edward Fox - Lord Harry Wrotham
 Diana Rigg - Lady Harriet Vulcan, Justin's mother
 Christopher Plummer - Sir Giles Staverley, Serena's father
 Stewart Granger - Old Lord Vulcan, Justin's father
 Fiona Fullerton  ...  Lady Isabel Gillingham  
 Neil Dickson  ...  Nicholas  
 Anna Massey  ...  Eudora, Serena's Maid
 Eileen Atkins  ...  Lady Harriet's Maid  
 Gareth Hunt  ...  Joker, a highwayman  
 Robert Addie  ...  Lord Peter Gillingham  
 James Gaddas  ...  Lord John Burley  
 Christopher Villiers  ...  Captain Jackson

Production
The novel was published in 1949. "This was my first costume book," Cartland said, "so I put in everything - highwaymen, jewels, the kitchen stove."

It was intended to be the first in a series of Cartland adaptations by producer Albert Fennell for CBS. He had optioned the novels ten years earlier and tried unsuccessfully to get finance. His option lapsed and producer Ed Friendly made The Flame is Love for NBC, which Cartland did not enjoy ("it was frightfully badly cast"). She was involved in A Hazard of Hearts from the beginning.

References

External links
 

1987 films
1987 romantic drama films
1987 television films
Films based on British novels
British romantic drama films
Gainsborough Pictures films
Films shot at Pinewood Studios
Television series produced at Pinewood Studios
Films directed by John Hough
Films scored by Laurie Johnson
Films with screenplays by Terence Feely
Films about gambling
1980s British films
British drama television films